The following is an episode list for the television series M.I. High, a children's adventure programme on the UK TV channel CBBC.

Series overview

Episodes

Series 1 (2007)
The BBC confirmed on 12 November 2006 that a 10 episodes series, lasting 30 minutes each, would be transmitted in early 2007 on CBBC channel. M.I. High was shown as part of the BBC's HD trial, available to viewers with HD services and was the first CBBC television program to be filmed and transmitted in High Definition. John East Head of BBC Drama and producer of M.I. High said "Filmed in High Definition, a first for CBBC, with jaw dropping stunts and hi-tech wizardry, M.I. High brings the quality of Spooks to a children's drama."

The main cast was confirmed as Bel Powley (as Daisy), Moustafa Chousein-Oglou (as Blane), Rachel Petladwala (as Rose) and Danny John-Jules (as Lenny).

Series 2 (2008)
The BBC announced on 14 August 2007 that M.I High was commissioned for a second series. The main cast returns from series one Bel Powley, Moustafa Chousein-Oglou, Rachel Petladwala and Danny John-Jules as Daisy, Blane, Rose and Lenny.

Series 3 (2009)

A third series was confirmed by the BBC 6 February 2008, with 13 episodes each lasting 30 minutes in length to transmit in 2009.  It was confirmed that Rachel Petladwala would return as her character Rose, with new actor's Charlene Osuagwu (as Carrie), Ben Kerfoot (as Oscar) and Jonny Freeman (as Frank London) would replace Bel Powley, Moustafa Chousein-Oglou and Danny John-Jules.

Aft the end of Series 2, Both Daisy and Blane left the M.I. High Series, to go off and help train new child agents for M.I.9.

Series 4 (2010)
It was confirmed on 19 March 2009 that M.I. High would return for a Fourth series, with 13 episodes each lasting 28 minutes.

Series 5 (2011)
The BBC confirmed on 10 October 2009 that M.I. High would return for a fifth series, It was confirmed that Rachel Petladwala, Charlene Osuagwu and Ben Kerfoot return as Rose, Carrie and Oscar. Additionally starring Julian Bleach as the Grand Master and Tracy-Ann Oberman as the Grand Mistress.

Series 6 (2013)

After a 16-month break, M.I. High was renewed for a sixth series in early 2013. The first broadcast of the show was aired on the CBBC channel on Monday 7 January 2013.

At the end of Series 5, Rose, Carrie and Oscar - portrayed by Rachel Petladwala, Charlene Osuagwu and Ben Kerfoot respectively - chose to leave the series, leaving M.I. High to work with Oscar's father, Edward Cole, at M.I.9 Headquarters.

Jonny Freeman was still playing his part as Frank London, the school caretaker and the head of the M.I. High project but was joined by four new characters: Dan Morgan (Sam Strike), Tom Tupper (Oscar Jacques), Aniesha Jones (Oyiza Momoh) and former skull agent, Zoe (Natasha Watson)

Because Rachel Petladwala, who portrayed Rose, decided to leave at the end of Series 5, Mr. Flatley (Chris Stanton) is now the only character to appear in all of the M.I. High series as the Headmaster of both schools that hosted the M.I. High project.

The M.I. High project has been moved to a new school called Bleakwood Academy but in the first episode it is later renamed as Saint Heart's by Mr Flatley.

Series 7 (2014)

A seventh series was confirmed in 2013 with filming beginning in the summer of that same year. The series premiered on CBBC on 13 January 2014. Nathan Cockerill is contributing scripts, and previous writers Malcolm McGonigle and Jonny Kurzman have also contributed one and two  scripts respectively.

Natasha Watson did not return for Series Seven because she was competing in a ballet competition and was unavailable for filming. Her character, Zoe, was written out as searching the world for other clones, who she sees as her sisters. One of her sisters, Keri, took her place instead.

The series is produced by Eric Coulter. The CBBC trailer confirmed the return of the appearances of the Main M.I. High agents Tom Tupper, Dan Morgan, Aneisha Jones, Frank and Stella.

The main St Heart's students and staffs confirmed the appearances of Mr. Flatley, Mrs. King, Roly, and two Brand new students, Preston  and Lady J. Byron.

Future Cancellation
In a web chat online question and answering session on the BBC website, the question was asked "Will there be another series of mi high?" and Johnny Freeman answered saying "There won't be a new series this year.

On Richard Senior (director) Twitter account he posted a message saying "That's the end - for now. It's finished in its current form. But the M.I.High project has been reborn before..."

Oscar Jacques who portrays Tom Tupper also confirmed this in a tweet.

References

External links
 
 
 Nathan Cockerill (Screen Writer) website

M.I. High